The 2018 season was Global Cebu's 2nd season in the Philippines Football League (PFL), the top flight of Philippine football. In addition to the PFL, the club also competed in the Copa Paulino Alcantara. The club finished last in the PFL, winning only once in their 25 matches. The club also forfeited five matches.

Preseason and friendlies

Friendlies

Competitions

Overview

Philippines Football League

Results summary

Result round by round

Regular season

Note:
 a  Due to the unavailability of Cebu City Sports Complex, the match will be played in away venue Biñan Football Stadium.
 b  Due to the bad condition of the pitch in the Cebu City Sports Complex, the match will be played in neutral venue Rizal Memorial Stadium, Biñan Football Stadium or PFF National Training Centre.
 c  Originally schedule on 2 May but the match was abandoned by Global Cebu. Kaya-Iloilo won 3–0 by default.
 d  Due to the unavailability of Davao del Norte Sports Complex, the match will be played in neutral venue Rizal Memorial Stadium.
 e  Due to the unavailability of Panaad Park and Stadium, the match will be played in neutral venue Rizal Memorial Stadium.
 f  Due to the unavailability of Iloilo Sports Complex, the match will be played in neutral venue PFF National Training Centre.
 g  Originally schedule on 3 July but the match was abandoned by Global Cebu. Davao Aguilas won 3–0 by default.
 h  Originally schedule on 8 July but the match was abandoned by Global Cebu. Stallion Laguna won 3–0 by default.
 i  Originally schedule on 11 July but the match was abandoned by Global Cebu. JPV Marikina won 3–0 by default.
 j  Originally schedule on 15 August but the match was abandoned by Global Cebu. Ceres–Negros won 3–0 by default.

Copa Paulino Alcantara

Group stage

Note:
 a  Due to the unavailability of Iloilo Sports Complex, the match will be played in neutral venue Rizal Memorial Stadium.
 b  Due to the unavailability of Marikina Sports Complex, the match will be played in neutral venue PFF National Training Centre.
 c  Due to the unavailability of Cebu City Sports Complex, the match will be played in neutral venue Rizal Memorial Stadium.

AFC Cup

Group stage

Ranking of second-placed teams

Squad

League squad

Transfer

Preseason transfer

In

Out

Mid-season transfer

In

Out

References

Global Makati F.C. seasons
Global Cebu 2018
Global Cebu 2018